Hathway Cable & Datacom Ltd, formerly BITV Cable Networks, is an Indian cable television service operator based in Mumbai. It was the first company to provide Internet using the CATV network in India, and the first cable operator to launch a digital platform in 2006. Hathway Broadband Internet was the first cable ISP in India. Business India Television (BITV) Cable Networks Pvt Ltd was acquired by Hathway in 1999. As of 2007, the company had a 51% stake in Bhupendran Bhaskar Multinet and 50% stake in Gujarat Telelinks Pvt Ltd (GTPL). In 2011, Hathway GTPL entered in Assam with a MoM with V&S Cable Pvt Ltd, and started operations in West Bengal as they acquired KCBPL (Kolkata Cable & Broadband Pariseva Ltd) to create a subsidiary, GTPLKCBPL, responsible for providing services in West Bengal.

Other services
In the second half of 2011, Hathway launched its HDTV services in Mumbai, Hyderabad, Bangalore, Chennai, Indore, Kolkata; in Gujarat in 2013, and in Odisha in 2015. Their new HD DVR set-top box initially provided 8 HD channels, with availability increasing to sixteen in March 2012. There are thirty channels available as of 2020. With this addition, Hathway is now the provider with the most HD channels in its Indian market.

Hathway Broadband Internet was one of the earliest cable ISP services in the Indian cities of Delhi, Mumbai, Indore, Bhopal, Lucknow and Kolkata. As of 2013, the highest possible speed provided is 50Mbit/s. It uses Cisco Systems's Docsis 3 technology in three cities, where the speeds exceed 50 Mbit/s.

There are around 11 million subscribers, of which around 1.77 million currently have wireless/broadband internet available. Approximately 430,000 of these users are using Hathway broadband services.

Hathway was the first Indian digital cable service provider to release digital video recorder (DVR) services, on March 12, 2009, powered by NDS XTV.

Acquisition by Reliance Industries 
Hathway was the multi-service operator owned by the Rajan Raheja Group. In 2003, it stood as one of the largest multi-system operators in India alongside the Hinduja Group companies of RPG Cable and InCablenet, and the Essel Group controlled Siti Cable, and also one of the three major cable distributors in India alongside DEN Networks and InCablenet.

The acquisition received approval from the Competition Commission of India in January 2019. Reliance acquired an additional 20.61% stake in Hathway through an open offer worth  in March 2019, taking its total stake in the company to 71.95%.

References

External links
 

Companies based in Mumbai
Mass media in Mumbai
Cable television companies of India
Reliance Media
Year of establishment missing
Companies listed on the National Stock Exchange of India
Companies listed on the Bombay Stock Exchange